Naturally is a South Korea reality show program on MBN starring Jeon In-hwa, Kim Jong-min, Hur Jae, Jo Byung-gyu, Kim Gook-jin and Kang Susie. The show airs on MBN every Saturday at 21:20 (KST) starting from August 3, 2019 and ended on May 30, 2020.

Changes in Running Time

Synopsis 
This show aims to let the cast members have their 2nd home at the countryside by using 1 million won to rent the houses. They will also be renovating the old countryside houses into the casts' dream house concepts and also be experiencing the stay at the countryside. Jeon In-hwa stays alone in the rented house, Eun Ji-won and Kim Jong-min stay together in another rented house together and Jo Byung-gyu stays with the original owner of the house.

Casts

Guests





Ratings 
 Ratings listed below are the individual corner ratings of Naturally. (Note: Individual corner ratings do not include commercial time, which regular ratings include.)

2019

2020

Notes

References

External links 
 Official website 

South Korean reality television series
South Korean television shows
2019 South Korean television series debuts
Korean-language television shows